Laufer was a rock band from Rijeka, Croatia that was active between 1986 and 1996. They were briefly active again after 2003.

They released two albums in 1994, The Best Off... under the minor label Corona, and Pustinje ("Deserts") under Croatia Records. In 2004, the former label released a compilation album Epitaf ("Epitaph"). The album The Best Off... was released again in 2010 by Dallas Records.

Pustinje 

Pustinje was Laufer's second studio album and was released in 1994 by Croatia Records. The album's material was prepared and recorded at the Krk island, Croatia, and remixed at the "RSL Luca" studios in Novo Mesto, Slovenia, while the final editing and processing was performed in the "Metro" studios, Ljubljana, Slovenia.
The album had a good response with the audience and the music critics.

Laufer members: Damir Urban (vocals), Vlado Simčić (electric guitar), Ljubo Silić (bass guitar) and Alen Tibljaš (drums), in September 1994 left for Krk island to prepare and record the material for the new studio album. The recording itself took little time, with most of the songs being recorded in one of the first essays, with the producer performing minor corrections and additional recordings being made in the summer break between the two concert tours. The topics of the songs are the everyday life of the time, such as the angst and confusion pertaining to growing up ("...hey dad, sorry for looking like a dog..."), insomnia, neurosis, anger, the destructive PTSD in the minds of the yesterday's street friends, the search for spirituality in the immaterial and material deserts of grey cities  ("... kiss our eyes they are like deserts, where I understand everything without a single word uttered.."), fatigue carved in the faces of passersby, bad news, being strapped for cash and the hopelessness, bad relationships ("...she will never understand what I am talking about.."), resulting with the recognizable, organic, bombastic sound. The optimism can however be felt throughout the album because Pustinje is actually one song divided into several musical parts.

In 1995, they were awarded the Porin music award for the best alternative rock album of the year.

Song list 
 "Falš" (0:24)
 "Hej tata" (2:25)
 "Vampir" (4:08)
 "Govorim u snu" (4:24)
 "Viđđđeno" (4:20)
 "Matematička" (3:22)
 "Mišolovka" (3:51)
 "Umorni kompas" (6:07)
 "Balerina" (3:55)
 "Mjesečev rog" (7:20)
 "Pustinje" (5:53)

Performers 
 Damir Urban - lead vocals
 Vlado Simčić - electric guitar
 Ljubo Silić - bass guitar
 Vedran Križan - keyboards
 Alen Tibljaš - drums
 Edi Kraljić - backing vocals

References

Croatian rock music groups
Musical groups established in 1986
Musical groups disestablished in 1996
1986 establishments in Croatia
Musicians from Rijeka
Culture in Rijeka